Edgar Ward Ainsworth (1910–1952) was a footballer who played in The Football League for Hull City and York City.

References

English footballers
Bridlington Town A.F.C. players
Hull City A.F.C. players
York City F.C. players
English Football League players
1910 births
1952 deaths
Association football goalkeepers